John Jacob may refer to:

 John Jacob, Marquis of Montferrat (1395–1445)
 Sir John Jacob, 1st Baronet (c. 1597–1666), royalist MP in England
 Sir John Jacob, 2nd Baronet of Bromley (c. 1633–1674), his son, of the Jacob baronets
 Sir John Jacob, 3rd Baronet of Bromley (c. 1665–1740), his son, of the Jacob baronets
 John J. Jacob (Kentucky businessman) (1770–1852), Kentucky businessman, financier, and philanthropist
 John Jacob (East India Company officer) (1812–1858), British officer and founder of Jacobabad in Pakistan
 John J. Jacob (West Virginia politician) (1829–1893), Governor of West Virginia in the United States
 John Jacob (Indiana politician), member of the Indiana House of Representatives
 John Edward Jacob (born 1934), president of the National Urban League in the United States
 John C. Jacob (1936–2008), environmental pioneer in Kerala, India
 John P. Jacob (born 1957), American writer and curator
 E. John Jacob, member of the Kerala Legislative Assembly
 S. John Jacob, member of the Tamil Nadu Legislative Assembly

See also

"John Jacob Jingleheimer Schmidt", a traditional children's song
John Jacobs (disambiguation)